Palmetto High School may refer to:
Miami Palmetto Senior High School in Pinecrest, Florida
Palmetto High School (Florida) in Palmetto, Florida
Palmetto High School (South Carolina) in Williamston, South Carolina